iTerm2 is a terminal emulator for macOS, licensed under GPL-2.0-or-later. It was derived from and has mostly supplanted the earlier "iTerm" application.

iTerm2 supports operating system features such as window transparency, full-screen mode, split panes, Exposé Tabs, Growl notifications, and standard keyboard shortcuts. Other features include customizable profiles and Instant Replay of past terminal input/output.

See also 

 List of terminal emulators
 Terminal (macOS), stock terminal emulator for macOS

References

External links 
 
 

Free software programmed in Objective-C
Free terminal emulators
MacOS-only free software
Utilities for macOS